Ezequiel Rodrigues Dutra Paraguassu (November 4, 1963) is a Brazilian judoka. He competed at the 1988 Seoul and 1992 Summer Olympics. He is particularly well-known for the use of the sode guruma jime (sleeve choke), widely known as the Ezequiel or Ezekiel choke, named after him by stylists of Brazilian jiu-jitsu.

References

Brazilian male judoka
Living people
Olympic judoka of Brazil
Judoka at the 1988 Summer Olympics
Judoka at the 1992 Summer Olympics
1964 births